Renwick, formerly known as Ravenwick, is a small village and former civil parish, now in the parish of Kirkoswald, in the Eden district, in the county of Cumbria, England. Renwick is located north east of Penrith between the A686 and B6413 roads. In 1931 the parish had a population of 174.

One mile south-east of the village in the hamlet of Haresceugh are the fragmentary remains of Haresceugh Castle, the site of which is now occupied by a farmhouse. Two sections of walling remain from the castle.

Etymology
"Renwick lies on Raven Beck..., but the probabilities are that the river-name is a back-formation from the place-name, and that Renwick is really 'Hrafn's wīc' ". ('Wīc' is Old English for 'farmstead' or 'settlement').

History 
According to local legend, the village was terrorized by a cockatrice in 1733. On 1 April 1934 the parish was abolished and merged into Kirkoswald.

See also

Listed buildings in Kirkoswald, Cumbria

References

External links 

  Cumbria County History Trust: Renwick (nb: provisional research only - see Talk page)
A comprehensive description from 1901

Villages in Cumbria
Former civil parishes in Cumbria
Kirkoswald, Cumbria